Ryan Koolwijk (born 8 August 1985) is a retired professional footballer who played as a midfielder for and current assistant coach of the Suriname national team.

He previously played for Excelsior, NEC, Dordrecht, AS Trenčín and Almere City. Born in the Netherlands, he represents the Suriname national team.

Club career
Born in Rotterdam, Koolwijk began his senior career with Excelsior during the 2007–08 season. He signed for NEC in May 2011. He also played for FC Dordrecht and Trenčín, before returning to Excelsior in May 2016. He returned to Trenčín in June 2019 and became a regular in the team's starting-XI. In April 2020, when the Fortuna Liga was suspended due to the COVID-19 pandemic in the country, Koolwijk ended his contract with the club by mutual agreement, as he intended to spend more time with his family in the Netherlands and he was dissatisfied by the proposed salary cut of over 50%, due to the pandemic. He signed with Almere City in May 2020.

He signed for PEC Zwolle in September 2021. After a season, which ended with relegation to the 2022–23 Eerste Divisie, 36-year old Koolwijk announced his retirement from football, as he had accepted a job offer as assistant coach of the Suriname national team.

International career
Born in the Netherlands, Koolwijk is of Surinamese descent. He debuted with the Suriname national team in a 6–0 2022 FIFA World Cup qualification win over Bermuda on 4 June 2021. On 25 June Koolwijk was named to the Suriname squad for the 2021 CONCACAF Gold Cup.

Career statistics

References

External links
 

1985 births
Living people
Footballers from Rotterdam
Surinamese footballers
Suriname international footballers
Dutch footballers
Dutch sportspeople of Surinamese descent
Excelsior Rotterdam players
NEC Nijmegen players
FC Dordrecht players
AS Trenčín players
Almere City FC players
PEC Zwolle players
Eredivisie players
Eerste Divisie players
Slovak Super Liga players
Association football midfielders
Surinamese expatriate footballers
Dutch expatriate footballers
Surinamese expatriate sportspeople in Slovakia
Dutch expatriate sportspeople in Slovakia
Expatriate footballers in Slovakia
2021 CONCACAF Gold Cup players